Ours To Destroy is a Canadian folk rock band from Calgary. The current line-up is David Morley, Steven Dodd, and Roland Griffith. The band's name is taken from Jeff Tweedy's reference to their music "We made it, it's ours to destroy" in the Wilco documentary I Am Trying to Break Your Heart on the making of Yankee Hotel Foxtrot.

The band formed in 2004 and released their first eponymous full-length CD Ours To Destroy in 2006.  The CD has received favorable reviews for its experimental nature and exploration of genres.

Ours to destroy toured in 2008, culminating in Toronto's NXNE Festival playing at Lee's Palace with Besnard Lakes and Swervedriver.

Discography

LPs
Ours To Destroy (The Sound Mind Records, 2006)

References

External links
Ours To Destroy Website
Ours To Destroy on CDBaby
Video Interview on R4NT Magazine

Musical groups established in 2004
Musical groups from Calgary
Canadian folk rock groups
Canadian experimental rock groups
2004 establishments in Alberta